This page is a list of 2018 UCI WorldTeams and riders. These teams are competing in the 2018 UCI World Tour.

Teams overview 
The 18 WorldTeams in 2018 are:

Riders





































References

See also 

 2018 in men's road cycling
 List of 2018 UCI Professional Continental and Continental teams
 List of 2018 UCI Women's Teams

2018 in men's road cycling
2018